Flight 863 may refer to

Trans International Airlines Flight 863, crashed on 8 September 1970
United Airlines Flight 863, nearly crashed on 28 June 1998

0863